(stylized as آلموج) is the 20th single by Japanese entertainer Akina Nakamori. Written by Akira Ōtsu and Takashi Satō, the single was released on January 27, 1988, by Warner Pioneer through the Reprise label. It was also the fourth single from her fourth compilation album Best II.

Background 
"Al-Mauj" is Arabic for "wave". The jacket photo was taken in Mykonos. On live TV performances, Nakamori had her microphone stand wrapped with rubber snakes.

Chart performance 
"Al-Mauj" became Nakamori's 18th No. 1 on Oricon's weekly singles chart and sold over 296,600 copies.

Track listing

Charts

References

External links 
 
 
 

1988 singles
1988 songs
Akina Nakamori songs
Japanese-language songs
Warner Music Japan singles
Reprise Records singles
Oricon Weekly number-one singles